The irregularity of distributions problem, stated first by Hugo Steinhaus, is a numerical problem with a surprising result. The problem is to find N numbers, all between 0 and 1, for which the following conditions hold:

 The first two numbers must be in different halves (one less than 1/2, one greater than 1/2).
 The first 3 numbers must be in different thirds (one less than 1/3, one between 1/3 and 2/3, one greater than 2/3).
 The first 4 numbers must be in different fourths.
 The first 5 numbers must be in different fifths.
 etc.

Mathematically, we are looking for a sequence of real numbers

such that for every n ∈ {1, ..., N} and every k ∈ {1, ..., n} there is some i ∈ {1, ..., k} such that

Solution 

The surprising result is that there is a solution up to N = 17, but starting at N = 18 and above it is impossible.  A possible solution for N ≤ 17 is shown diagrammatically on the right; numerically it is as follows:

 

In this example, considering for instance the first 5 numbers, we have

 

Mieczysław Warmus concluded that 768 (1536, counting symmetric solutions separately) distinct sets of intervals satisfy the conditions for N = 17.

References
 H. Steinhaus, One hundred problems in elementary mathematics, Basic Books, New York, 1964, page 12

 M. Warmus, "A Supplementary Note on the Irregularities of Distributions", Journal of Number Theory 8, 260–263, 1976.

Fractions (mathematics)